Tandoori Magazine is a British bi-monthly trade magazine for the South Asian food and catering industry.

See also
South Asian cuisine

References

1994 establishments in England
Bangladeshi cuisine in the United Kingdom
Bi-monthly magazines published in the United Kingdom
Business magazines published in the United Kingdom
English-language magazines
Food and drink magazines
Magazines established in 1994
Magazines published in London
Online magazines published in the United Kingdom